Tranquillimonas is a Gram-negative, obligately halophilic, rod-shaped and non-motile genus of bacteria from the family of Rhodobacteraceae with one known species (Tranquillimonas alkanivorans). Tranquillimonas alkanivorans has been isolated from seawater from the Semarang Port in Indonesia.

References

Rhodobacteraceae
Bacteria genera
Monotypic bacteria genera